Jamar Jan (also Romanized as Jamār Jān and Jomār Jān) is a village in Khvajehei Rural District, Meymand District, Firuzabad County, Fars Province, Iran. At the 2006 census, its population was 31, in 7 families.

References 

Populated places in Firuzabad County